Athana is a nagar panchayat in Jawad Tehsil of Neemuch district, Madhya Pradesh, India. Athana is famous for its Krishna Palace built by Rawat Narsinghdas Ji in 1628.

References

Villages in Neemuch district